Lilian Imuetinyan Salami (born August 8, 1956) is a Nigerian academic and vice-chancellor of the University of Benin, Edo State, Nigeria. She is the second female vice-chancellor of the university after Grace Alele-Williams in 1985. She was director-general/chief executive of the National Institute for Educational Planning and Administration (NIEPA), Ondo State, Nigeria.

A former dean, faculty of education at the University of Benin, Salami is a Fellow of the Nutrition Society of Nigeria and International Federation of Home Economics/Home Professional Association of Nigeria.

Salami is professor of home economics/nutritional education and a member of the advisory council to his royal majesty, the Oba of Benin, Omo N’Oba N’Edo, Ukukpolokpolo, Ogidigan, Oba Ewuare II.

Early life and education

Salami was born in Jos, Nigeria. However, she is from Edo, specifically a Bini woman.
She began her early childhood education in Jos, Plateau State; but due to the Nigerian Civil War (1967–1970), she received her secondary school education in Edo State and earned a West African School Certificate (WASC) under the auspices of Baptist High School, Benin City. 
Her hunger for a world-class education motivated her to go to the United States and earned B.Sc. (Hons) home economics and M.Sc. nutrition degrees at North Dakota State University in 1979 and 1982 respectively.

She was, however, at the University of Wisconsin and the University of Minnesota for summer classes before transferring to North Dakota State University, where she later completed her studies as a result of being married in 1977. She returned home and served her country under the platform of National Youth Service Corps (NYSC), Benin City between 1983 and 1984.

Her love for quality education made her to further her studies at the University of Nigeria in 1989 where she earned a
Ph.D. in human nutrition in 1991. While lecturing at the University of Benin, she enrolled as a student there and earned a postgraduate diploma in education (PGDE) in 2001.

She had her postdoctorate degree at Vaal University of Technology, Vanderbijlpark in South Africa, which she earned in 2005.

Career

Salami began her career with the University of Benin as a senior lecturer in 1994. Prior to her appointment with this institution, she had briefly taught at the then University of Ife, now Obafemi Awolowo University having completed her national youth service with the NYSC, Benin City in 1984. Subsequently, she lectured at the University of Maiduguri from 1985 to 1994.

She was head of department from 1996 to 1998 at the University of Benin and attained the status of a professor in 2005. Held administrative positions such as chairman of the board of University of Benin Integrated Enterprise, director of general studies, director of part-time programme, director-general/chief executive, National Institute for Educational Planning and Administration (NIEPA), Ondo State, among others, Salami has successfully supervised over 15 Ph.D. and 40 master's degree students.

Salami has contributed to knowledge through written articles in national and international journals, and has taught several courses within the scope of Home Economics and Nutrition.

References

External links 

Prof Lilian Salami Appointed New Vice Chancellor Of UNIBEN

Living people
Nigerian women academics
Vice-Chancellors of Nigerian universities
Academic staff of the University of Benin (Nigeria)
21st-century Nigerian women
1956 births
University of Nigeria alumni
North Dakota State University alumni
Nigerian academic administrators
Nigerian academics
People from Edo State